Gustav Hermann Sorge (24 April 1911 – 3 October 1978), nicknamed "Der eiserne Gustav" ("Iron Gustav") for his brutality, was an SS senior NCO (Hauptscharführer). He was initially a guard at Esterwegen concentration camp in the Emsland region of Germany. Later on, he was assigned to the Sachsenhausen concentration camp.

Career 
Among the many people who were murdered at Sachsenhausen by Sorge was Leon Sternbach, a professor of classical philology at the Jagiellonian University and the paternal uncle of famed chemist, Leo Sternbach.
Sorge became a prisoner of war of the USSR after the war. He was tried as a war criminal by the Soviet Union in the Sachsenhausen trial held in the former city hall of Berlin-Pankow in 1947, along with Sachsenhausen commandant, Anton Kaindl, prison block director, Kurt Eccarius and others. He was convicted and sentenced to life imprisonment.

Retrial 
Sorge was repatriated to West Germany in 1956 on the condition that he continue to serve the life sentence imposed by the Soviets.  He was put on trial with fellow SS guard, Wilhelm Schubert, in Bonn for the 1941 murders of over 13,000 Soviet prisoners of war, many of whom were invalided, at Sachsenhausen concentration camp. The murders were carried out on a daily basis for six weeks. The retrial was ordered by the Federal Ministry of Justice of Germany to assuage public concern that the original verdicts in 1947 were indeed warranted. He was convicted of 67 individual murders and numerous counts of manslaughter and re-sentenced to a life term. He was sent to Rheinbach prison near Bonn, where he died in 1978.

See also 
Martin Sommer

References 

1911 births
1978 deaths
Holocaust perpetrators in Germany
SS non-commissioned officers
Sachsenhausen concentration camp personnel
People from Leszno County
People from the Province of Posen
Kaiserwald concentration camp personnel
20th-century Freikorps personnel
People convicted of murder by Germany
German people convicted of murder
German prisoners sentenced to life imprisonment
Prisoners sentenced to life imprisonment by Germany
Prisoners sentenced to life imprisonment by the Soviet Union
Prisoners who died in German detention
Nazis who died in prison custody
German prisoners of war in World War II held by the Soviet Union
People convicted in the Nazi concentration camp trials